This is a list of spies who engaged in direct espionage. It includes Americans spying against their own country and people spying on behalf of the United States.

American Revolution era spies

Spied for the Patriots

 Hercules Mulligan
 Abraham Woodhull
 Benjamin Edes
 Nathan Hale
 Benjamin Tallmadge
 Caleb Brewster
 William H. Dobbs (Captain)
 Clément Gosselin
 Daniel Bissell
 David Henley
 Enoch Crosby
 Ethan Allen
 Henry K. Van Rensselaer
 John Brown of Pittsfield
 John Champe
 John Clark
 John Honeyman
 John Laurens
 Jonathan L. Austin
 Lydia Darrah
 Paul Revere
 Philip Mazzei
 Pierre Ayotte
 Silas Deane
 Van Rensselaer's Regiment
 William Bingham

Culper Ring

 Abraham Woodhull
 Agent 355
 Anna Strong
 Austin Roe
 Benjamin Tallmadge
 Robert Townsend
 Sarah Townsend
 Caleb Brewster
 Cato
 James Rivington
 Jonas Hawkins

Spied for the Crown

 Ann Bates
 Benedict Arnold
 Benjamin Church
 Miss Jenny
 Metcalf Bowler
 John André

Double agents

 Edward Bancroft
 James Armistead Lafayette
 John Champe
 Jack McAnany
 Jack January

American Civil War era spies

Union spies

 Albert D. Richardson
 Charles C. Carpenter
 Elizabeth Van Lew
 Mary Bowser
 George Curtis
 Harriet Tubman
 Kate Warne
 Lafayette C. Baker
 Pauline Cushman
 Philip Henson
 Sarah Emma Edmonds
 Timothy Webster
 Allan Pinkerton
 John Scobell
 Grenville Dodge
 Hattie Lawton
 Pryce Lewis

Confederate spies

 Alexander Keith, Jr.
 Annie Jones
 Antonia Ford
 Belle Boyd
 Confederate Signal Bureau
 David Owen Dodd
 Dr. William Joseph Heacker
 Henry Thomas Harrison
 James Dunwoody Bulloch
 John Yates Beall
 Joseph Baden
 Richard Thomas (Zarvona)
 Rose O'Neal Greenhow
 Sarah Slater
 Thomas A. Jones
 Thomas Harbin
 Thomas Jordan
 Virginia Bethel Moon
 William Bryant
 William Norris

American World War One era spies

 Julius Klein
 Marguerite Harrison
 Sylvanus Morley
 Sidney Mashbir

American World War Two era spies

 Amy Elizabeth Thorpe
 Arthur Goldberg
 Arthur M. Schlesinger, Jr.
 Claire Phillips
 Eric Erickson
 Frederick Mayer
 Fritz Kolbe
 Virginia Hall
 Joan Bondurant
 John Birch
 Martin Quigley, Jr.
 Moe Berg
 Rene Joyeuse
 Richard Sakakida
 Sidney Mashbir
 Sterling Hayden
 William G. Sebold
 Harold Ware

American Cold War era spies

Spied for America

 Aleksandr Dmitrievich Ogorodnik
 Arkady Shevchenko
 Boris Morros
 Boris Yuzhin
 Francis Gary Powers
 Gerry Droller
 Heinz Barwich
 John Birch
 Miles Copeland, Jr.
 Milton Bearden
 Nicholas Shadrin
 Otto von Bolschwing
 Peter Burke, 1979 secretary in the US embassy in Poland
 Philip Agee
 Robert Baer
 Ruth Fischer
 William Wear
 Yosef Amit
 Yuri Nosenko
 Oleg Penkovsky
 Vitaly Yurchenko
 Dmitri Polyakov
 Oleg Gordievsky
 Adolf Tolkachev

Spied for USSR

 Agnes Smedley
 Al Sarant
 Alan Nunn May
 Aldrich Ames
 Alexander Koral
 Alexander Ulanovsky
 Alfred Tilton
 Allan Robert Rosenberg
 Anatole Volkov
 Anatoly Gorsky
 Arthur Adams
 Arvid Jacobson
 Bela Gold
 Bill Weisband
 Boris Morros
 Charles Kramer
 David Greenglass
 Donald Niven Wheeler
 Donald Heathfield
 Earl Browder
 Elizabeth Zarubina
 Frank Coe
 George Koval
 George Mink (alias Minkoff)
 George Silverman
 Harold Glasser
 Harry Dexter White
 Harry Gold
 Harry Magdoff
 Hede Massing
 Helen Silvermaster
 Herbert Fuchs
 Irving Kaplan
 Irving Lerner
 Jacob Golos
 Jane Foster Zlatovski
 John Abt
 John Herrmann
 John Anthony Walker
 Julian Wadleigh
 Juliet Stuart Poyntz
 Julius Rosenberg 
 Ethel Rosenberg
 Klaus Fuchs
 Lauchlin Currie
 Lee Pressman
 Lona Cohen
 Louis F. Budenz
 Martha Dodd Stern
 Michael Lance Walker, son of John Anthony Walker
 Morris Cohen
 Morton Sobell
 Nathan Gregory Silvermaster
 Nathan Witt
 Nathaniel Weyl
 Noel Field
 Norman Chandler Bursler
 Reino Häyhänen
 Robert Hanssen
 Robert P. Smith
 Russell Alton McNutt
 Saville Sax
 Solomon Adler aka Schlomer Adler
 Sonia Steinman Gold
 Theodore Hall
 Tracey Foley
 Victor Perlo
 Vilyam Genrikhovich Fisher
 Vincent Reno
 Ward Pigman
 Whittaker Chambers
 William Henry Taylor
 William "Lud" Ullman

Spied for Vietnam
 David Truong
 Ronald Humphrey

Spied for Israel
Jonathan Pollard

Post-Cold War spies

Spied on Iran for America
 Shahram Amiri

Spied on Russia for America
 Valery Mikhailov
 Col. Vladimir Lazar

Spied on America for Russia
 The Russian 10 from the Illegals Program - included: Richard and Cynthia Murphy, Juan Lazaro, Vicky Peláez and Anna Chapman

Spied on America for China

 Katrina Leung
 Chi Mak
 Glenn Duffie Shriver
 Noshir Gowadia

Spied on America for Israel
 Johnathan Pollard
 Stewart Nozette
 Ben-Ami Kadish

Spied on America for Cuba
 Carlos Alvarez
 Elsa Alvarez
 Ana Montes
 Kendall Myers
 Gwendolyn Myers
 Wasp Network

Spied on Cuba for America
 Rolando Sarraff Trujillo

American Gulf War era spies

 April Fool

Americans who spied for foreign countries

CIA 

 Aldrich Ames
 David Henry Barnett
 Kevin Mallory
 Harold James Nicholson
 Larry Wu-Tai Chin
 Sharon M. Scranage
 William Kampiles

NSA

 David Sheldon Boone
 Ronald Pelton

FBI

 Earl Edwin Pitts
 Richard Miller
 Robert Hanssen

Defense Intelligence Agency 
 Ana Belén Montes

Armed Forces

 Clayton John Lonetree
 John Anthony Walker
 Morris Cohen
 George Trofimoff
 Clyde Lee Conrad
 Peter Debbins
 Monica Witt

Federal contractors

 Andrew Daulton Lee
 Christopher John Boyce
 Jonathan Pollard
 Stewart Nozette
 Kimberly Tillman

References

Further reading
 
 
Spies